A student quiz show (sometimes academic quiz show) is a television or radio quiz show featuring contestants who represent the schools they attend. NBC4's It's Academic in the Washington, DC metropolitan area is the longest running student quiz program in the world.

Gameplay and variations

Student quiz shows are played by two to four teams of players. Each game usually consists of several differing rounds of play. Some rounds are played with a lock-out device and electronic signaling devices ("buzzers") and questions played with them are called tossups. Once a player has rung in, they usually have only few seconds to give answer. This time is usually long for computational mathematics problems.

There are also usually rounds that are directed towards a single team to answer. These are usually known as "lightning rounds" or "60 second rounds".

Winnings teams sometimes win a monetary prize provided by either program sponsors the studio itself. This prize can come in the form of a scholarship or as a check to the winning school that the administration will decide its use.

See also
List of televised student quiz competitions
Quiz bowl

References

Game shows
Television genres
Secondary education in the United States